Adaptatziya (Bulgarian language:Адаптация, English language: Adaption) is a 1981 Bulgarian social drama film directed and written by Vulo Radev. The film is centres on important social themes and issues. The film premiered on 22 June 1981 in Bulgaria. The film was produced by BNT.

Cast
Eli Skorcheva ....  Veronika
Antony Genov ....  D-r Bankov
Ivan Grigorov ....  D-r Galabov
Nikolai Sotirov ....  Kostadin
Lyuben Chatalov ....  Bogomil
Elena Kuneva ....  Rositza
Neli Valkanova ....  Hristina
Anya Pencheva ....  Zhechka
Ilia Karaivanov ....  Asen
Yuri Manolov ....  Delyan
Veselin Atanasov ....  Dimitar
Marina Marinova ....  Evelina
Vihar Stoychev ....  Rumen
Konstantin Dimchev ....  Prof, Shtarbanov
Jordan Mutafov ....  Dotzent Engyozov

See also
List of Bulgarian films

External links
 

1981 films
1981 drama films
1980s Bulgarian-language films
Bulgarian drama films